2021 Lyon Open may refer to:

2021 ATP Lyon Open
2021 WTA Lyon Open